Henseleit is a German language surname. It stems from the German name Hänsel (meaning "little Hans"), a diminutive of the given name Hans – and may refer to:
Esther Henseleit (1999),  German professional golfer
Kurt Henseleit (1908–1973), German chemist

References 

German-language surnames
Surnames from given names